The Royal Mausoleum in Oslo, Norway, is located within the Castle of Akershus, where it was established in 1948.

Information 
The Royal Mausoleum contains two sarcophagi: in a white sarcophagus of marble rest King Haakon VII of Norway (1872–1957) and Queen Maud of Norway (1869–1938), née Princess Maud of Wales, and in a green sarcophagus rest King Olav V of Norway (1903–1991) and Crown Princess Märtha of Norway (1901–1954), née Princess of Sweden.

The Royal Mausoleum also contains, in its walls, the remains of King Haakon V of Norway (1270–1319) and Queen Euphemia of Norway (1270–1312), née von Rügen, as well as that of King Sigurd I of Norway (c. 1090–1130). The remains were transferred from St. Mary's Church and St. Hallvard's Cathedral, respectively, both in Oslo.

Other burial sites

Kings 
With few exceptions, burial sites or remains of Norwegian monarchs before 1380 have disappeared. Possible burial sites include the Nidaros Cathedral in Trondheim and either one or more churches in Bergen.

Nearly all Norwegian monarchs between 1380 and 1905 are buried abroad. Confirmed burial sites abroad include:

 the Roskilde Cathedral outside Copenhagen, Denmark
 the Riddarholm Church in Stockholm, Sweden
 St. Peter's Cathedral in Schleswig, today's Germany
 St. Mary's Church in Darłowo, today's Poland

Petty kings 

Predating the official list of Norwegian monarchs (872–present), a large number of petty kings and chieftains are buried in many parts of Norway. Some possible or confirmed burial sites include:

 Borre (Royal Cemetery), Vestfold 
 Gokstad, Vestfold
 Oseberg, Vestfold

See also 
 Burial sites of European monarchs and consorts

References

Mausoleums in Norway
Norwegian monarchy
Burial sites of the House of Sverre
Burial sites of the House of Glücksburg